Brian Goggin may refer to:
 Brian Goggin (banker)
 Brian Goggin (artist)